Howard Pechet is a Canadian hotelier and producer.  Pechet graduated from Washington State University with a Master of Arts degree.  He is non-executive producer of Stage West and chairman of Stagewest Hospitality, which includes several hotels, dinner theatres and casinos. Pechet started Stage West in Edmonton, Alberta.  He expanded this to Calgary and Winnipeg and then to the Toronto region, with the Mississauga theatre on Dixie Road, which opened in 1986. The first show in Mississauga was a small-scale comedy, Social Security by Andrew Bergman. Pechet has produced almost 1,000 plays and has co-written 14 musical revues.

Awards and achievements
Pechet has produced almost 1,000 plays and has co-written 14 musical revues, setting the Guinness World Record for producing the most theatre productions.

Other
Pechet is a director of several corporations, including the Canadian Western Bank, which the Pechet family began in 1984.

Personal life

Pechet is married and lives in Rancho Mirage, California.

References

External links
 Stagewest Hospitality Corporate Website, 2017 website via Wayback Machine

Canadian hoteliers
Canadian theatre managers and producers
Canadian male dramatists and playwrights
Canadian people of Romanian descent
University of Alberta alumni
Washington State University alumni
Date of birth missing (living people)
20th-century Canadian dramatists and playwrights
21st-century Canadian dramatists and playwrights
20th-century Canadian male writers
21st-century Canadian male writers
Living people
Year of birth missing (living people)